The William C. Dale Power Station is a coal-fired power station owned and operated by East Kentucky Cooperative near Winchester, Kentucky. It is located about 20 miles southeast of Lexington, Kentucky.

Emissions Data
 2006 CO2 Emissions: 1,186,544 tons
 2006 SO2 Emissions:
 2006 SO2 Emissions per MWh:
 2006 NOx Emissions:
 2005 Mercury Emissions:

See also

Coal mining in Kentucky

References

Energy infrastructure completed in 1954
Buildings and structures in Clark County, Kentucky
1954 establishments in Kentucky
Coal-fired power plants in Kentucky